MTT can refer to:

People
 Michael Tilson Thomas (nicknamed 'MTT'), American musician, conductor, pianist

Technology and science
 Meaning–text theory, a theory in linguistics
 MTT assay using dimethyl thiazolyl diphenyl tetrazolium salt, a type of tetrazole
 Multi-transaction translator, a particular functional unit in USB hubs

Business
 Marine Turbine Technologies
 Maritime Telephone and Telegraph Company, later known as MTT or MT&T

Transport
 Metropolitan Transport Trust, transport authority in Western Australia from 1958 to 2003
 Minatitlán/Coatzacoalcos National Airport, IATA code MTT
 Municipal Tramways Trust, former body in Adelaide, South Australia

Other
 Maria Theresa thaler, former Austrian coin used in many areas
 Pashtun Tahafuz Movement (PTM), formerly known as the Mehsud Tahafuz Tehrik (MTT), a human rights movement in Pakistan for the Pashtun people
 Multi-table tournament, a type of poker tournament
 Modus tollens, a kind of rule of inference also known as modus tollendo tollens

Fiction
 Multi-troop transport vehicle in Star Wars
 Mettaton, a robot character from Undertale